Ratu Ilaijia Varani  was a chief of Viwa, Bau Island, Tailevu in Fiji in the mid-to-late 19th century.

Career 
He was a friend and the right hand of Ratu Seru Epenisa Cakobau. He converted to Christianity on Good Friday, 1845. His island of Viwa became a refuge for persecuted Christians.

Varani protected early missionaries such as Reverend John Hunt and Wiliam Lyth in the early 19th century. Under his protection, Christian missionaries spread Christianity much more quickly than would have been expected.

Memorials
One of the four houses at the Lelean Memorial School, a Methodist Church of Fiji run school at its Davuilevu compound at Nausori, Fiji, is named after Varani.

References

 Tippett, A.R., 1954, The Christian (Fiji 1835–1867), Auckland Institute and Museum, Auckland
 GARRETT, John, 1982, To Live Among the Stars: Christian origins in Oceania,World Council of Churches in association with the Institute of Pacific Studies of the University of the South Pacific, Geneva/Suva.
 CABENALEVU, Peni, 1996, ‘Viwa and Ratu Varani/Ko Ratu Ravisa Varani’,in Thornley and Vulaono 1996:73–86.

Methodist missionaries in Fiji
Methodist Church of Fiji and Rotuma
Fijian Methodist missionaries
Year of death unknown
Year of birth unknown
Converts to Methodism
Fijian chiefs